The 2022 All-Ireland Minor Football Championship was the 91st staging of the All-Ireland Minor Football Championship since its establishment by the Gaelic Athletic Association in 1929. The championship began on 19 March 2022 and ended on 8 July 2022.

Meath entered the championship as the defending champions, however, they were beaten in all three of their group stage games in the Leinster Championship.

The All-Ireland final was played on 8 July 2022 at Dr. Hyde Park in Roscommon, between Galway and Mayo, in what was their first ever meeting in an All-Ireland final but their third meeting in that year's championship. Galway won the match by 0-15 to 0-09 to claim their seventh championship title overall and a first title in 15 years.  

Mayo's Ronan Clare was the championship's top scorer with 3-43.

Connacht Minor Football Championship

Connacht group table

{| class="wikitable" 
!width=10|
!width=170 style="text-align:left;"|Team
!width=10|
!width=10|
!width=10|
!width=10|
!width=30|
!width=30|
!width=10|
!width=10|
|- style="background:#FFFFE0"
|1||align=left| Mayo||4||4||0||0||83||43||40||8
|- style="background:#ccffcc" 
|2||align=left| Galway||4||2||0||2||68||58||10||4
|- style="background:#ccffcc" 
|3||align=left| Sligo||4||2||0||2||76||87||-11||4
|-  style="background:#ace1af;"
|4||align=left| Leitrim||4||1||1||2||60||80||-20||3
|-  style="background:#ace1af;"
|5||align=left| Roscommon||4||0||1||3||60||79||-19||1
|}

Connacht group stage results

Connacht semi-final

Connacht shield final

Connacht final

Leinster Minor Football Championship

Leinster group 1 table

{| class="wikitable" 
!width=10|
!width=170 style="text-align:left;"|Team
!width=10|
!width=10|
!width=10|
!width=10|
!width=30|
!width=30|
!width=10|
!width=10|
|- style="background:#FFFFE0"
|1||align=left| Dublin||3||3||0||0||71||19||52||6
|- style="background:#ccffcc" 
|2||align=left| Laois||3||2||0||1||51||44||7||4
|-  style="background:#ace1af;"
|3||align=left| Westmeath||3||1||0||2||36||47||-11||2
|- 
|4||align=left| Louth||3||0||0||3||27||75||-48||0
|}

Leinster group 1 results

Leinster group 2 table

{| class="wikitable" 
!width=10|
!width=170 style="text-align:left;"|Team
!width=10|
!width=10|
!width=10|
!width=10|
!width=30|
!width=30|
!width=10|
!width=10|
|- style="background:#FFFFE0"
|1||align=left| Kildare||3||3||0||0||57||29||28||6
|- style="background:#ccffcc" 
|2||align=left| Longford||3||2||0||1||42||39||3||4
|-  style="background:#ace1af;"
|3||align=left| Offaly||3||1||0||2||28||52||-24||2
|- 
|4||align=left| Meath||3||0||0||3||40||51||-11||0
|}

Leinster group 2 results

Leinster group 3 table

{| class="wikitable" 
!width=10|
!width=170 style="text-align:left;"|Team
!width=10|
!width=10|
!width=10|
!width=10|
!width=30|
!width=30|
!width=10|
!width=10|
|-  style="background:#ace1af;"
|1||align=left| Wicklow||2||2||0||0||34||18||16||4
|-  style="background:#ace1af;"
|2||align=left| Carlow||2||1||0||1||24||22||2||2
|-   
|3||align=left| Wexford||2||0||0||2||12||30||-18||0
|}

Leinster group 3 results

Leinster preliminary quarter-finals

Leinster quarter-finals

Leinster semi-finals

Leinster final

Munster Minor Football Championship

Munster phase 1 group table

{| class="wikitable" 
!width=10|
!width=170 style="text-align:left;"|Team
!width=10|
!width=10|
!width=10|
!width=10|
!width=30|
!width=30|
!width=10|
!width=10|
|- style="background:#FFFFE0"
|1||align=left| Tipperary||3||3||0||0||68||31||37||6
|- style="background:#FFFFE0"
|2||align=left| Limerick||3||2||0||1||44||36||8||4
|- 
|3||align=left| Clare||3||1||0||2||50||39||11||2
|- 
|4||align=left| Waterford||3||0||0||3||22||78||-56||0
|}

Munster phase 1 group stage

Munster phase 1 final

Munster semi-finals

Munster final

Ulster Minor Football Championship

Ulster preliminary round

Ulster round 1

Ulster round 2

Ulster qualifiers

Ulster semi-finals

Ulster final

All-Ireland Minor Football Championship

All-Ireland quarter-finals

All-Ireland semi-finals

All-Ireland final

Championship statistics

Top scorers

Overall

In a single game

References

All-Ireland Minor Football Championship
All-Ireland Minor Football Championship